The 1974 Uganda National League was the seventh season of the Ugandan football championship, the top-level football league of Uganda.

Overview
The 1974 Uganda National League was contested by 8 teams and was won by Express FC. In the two previous seasons of 1972 and 1973 the championship was not completed because of civil unrest.

League standings

Leading goalscorer
The top goalscorer in the 1974 season was Peter Kirumira of Express FC with 14 goals.

References

External links
Uganda - List of Champions - RSSSF (Hans Schöggl)
Ugandan Football League Tables - League321.com

Ugandan Super League seasons
Uganda
Uganda
Football